Johan Thorn Prikker (6 June 1868, The Hague - 5 March 1932, Cologne) was a Dutch artist who worked in Germany after 1904. His activities were very eclectic, including architecture, lithography, furniture, stained-glass windows, mosaics, tapestries and book covers as well as painting. He also worked in a variety of styles; such as Symbolism, Impressionism and Art Nouveau.

Biography
He was the son of a house painter. From 1881 to 1887, he was enrolled at the Royal Academy of Art, but left without completing his studies. In 1890, his friend Jan Toorop introduced him to the work of the Belgian art group, Les XX, who he exhibited with. Two years later, Joséphin Péladan gave him a similar introduction to the Salon de la Rose + Croix. Much of his painting, in the Symbolist style, was done during this period, from 1891 to 1895.

In 1898, he became artistic director of the "Arts & Crafts" gallery in The Hague, which sold many Art Nouveau items and furnishings in addition to art works. He began designing furniture at this time, inspired by the work of Henry Van de Velde, who he had met in Belgium. That same year, he was married, but his wife died from a miscarriage only a year later. In 1900, he had a falling-out with the gallery's founder, Chris Wegerif (1859-1920), and resigned.

Despite this success, the clash between his aesthetics and the prevailing art styles, which was behind his departure from the gallery, continued. In addition, his political beliefs caused him to receive bad press (he was an anarchist when most of the Dutch art world favored socialism), which had a negative effect on his ability to obtain work. In 1904, he decided to move to Germany.

With help from the art historian and museum director, Friedrich Deneken, he was able to obtain a teaching position in Krefeld at the new "Handwerker- und Kunstgewerbeschule". This gave him a free hand to create furniture and fabric designs. He also took his students on field trips to show them the pleasures of painting en plein air.

In 1910, he left Krefeld for Hagen to participate in the avant-garde movement being sponsored and promoted by Karl Ernst Osthaus. He soon received numerous commissions for murals, mosaics and stained-glass windows, including those at the Gesellenhaus (meeting hall)  in Neuss, designed by Peter Behrens. During his stay in Hagen, he was a teacher at the Kunstgewerbeschule in Essen and remarried. His son from that marriage,  became a well-known professional motorcycle racer. During the years 1917 and 1918 in Essen, he taught the young Josef Albers his stained-glass making techniques, which impacted greatly Albers’ oeuvre.

After a short stay in Überlingen from 1919 to 1920, he moved to Munich where he taught glass-painting and monumental art, then transferred to the Kunstakademie Düsseldorf, followed by the Cologne Art and Craft Schools in 1926. He remained there until his death. During his last decade, he focused on mosaics and stained-glass.

Selected works

References

Further reading
 Christiane Heiser, Kunst-Religion-Gesellschaft. Das Werk von Johan Thorn Prikker zwischen 1890 und 1912. Vom niederländischen Symbolismus zum Deutschen Werkbund, Doctoral thesis, University of Groningen, 2008 
 Christiane Heiser, Mienke Simon Thomas and Barbara Til, Johan Thorn Prikker: De Jugendstil voorbij, Drukkerij Die Keure, 2010

External links

 Videos relating to Thorn Prikker @ ARTtube

1868 births
1932 deaths
Art Nouveau painters
Art Nouveau designers
Dutch painters
Dutch male painters
Dutch designers
Artists from The Hague
Dutch stained glass artists and manufacturers
Mosaic artists
Dutch emigrants to Germany